Exit Stage Right is a live album by British alternative rock band A, released in 2000 on London Records. It reached #3 on the UK Indie Chart. The title is a parody of Rush's 1981 live album Exit...Stage Left.

Track listing
All songs written by Jason Perry

"Intro" - 0:24
"If it Ain't Broke, Fix it Anyway" - 2:32
Recorded live in Munich, Germany, February 2000
"Monkey Kong" - 3:44
Recorded live in Los Angeles, CA, United States, March 2000
"A" - 3:27
Recorded live at the London Astoria, UK, January 2000
"Old Folks" - 4:01
Recorded live in Frankfurt, Germany, February 2000
"I Love Lake Tahoe" - 4:51
Recorded live in Zurich, Switzerland, February 2000
"Over It" - 1:43
Recorded live in Frankfurt, Germany, February 2000
"Foghorn" - 4:30
Recorded live in Lisbon, Vans Warped Tour, September 1999

References

A (band) albums
2000 live albums
London Records live albums
Albums produced by Jason Perry